Malich may refer to:
 Malich-e Bozorg
 Malich-e Kuchek